In aviation, an upper information region (UIR) is a flight information region in upper airspace.

See also
Area control center (list)
Airway (aviation)
Air corridor
Control area (aviation)
Control zone
Terminal control area

Air traffic control